The fête de l'Humanité (English: Festival of Humanity) is an event organised annually by French daily newspaper L'Humanité in order to fund itself. It is the largest popular gathering in France.

L'Humanité was created in 1904 by French socialist Jean Jaurès, but the first fête de l'Humanité took place in September 1930 to raise funds for the newspaper L'Humanité and 1000 people attended it. In 2010, the festival attracted 600,000 visitors. A new record was set in 2018, when 800,000 visitors participated in the festival.

The festival is organized and held almost exclusively by volunteers, since it exists to fund the newspaper. 

Hundreds of stalls are scattered around the venue offering food and drinks with the stall holders coming from all over the world to be part of the event. The fête is a unique mix of politics and entertainment, with concerts happening alongside many debates, art exhibits, movies, etc. Because of the close relationship between l'Humanité and the French Communist Party, most of the volunteers are communists, even though most of the attendees are not. 

The festival comprises many stages (Grande Scène (main stage), scène Zebrock (rock stage), scène reggae, P'tite Scène (smaller stage), and tens of smaller stages inside stalls). The Main Stage can accommodate about 100,000 spectators. 

Due to its size, this festival is considered the kickoff of the left-wing's "political year" each year in September. Tens of thousands of left-wing activists gather there to celebrate and debate (from many political currents: communists, but also social-democrats, anarchists, Trotskyists, sympathizers of the left wing, etc.). They forget their disagreements for a festive weekend and get energized to start the year. 

The festival is usually attended by the main figures of the French left wing (leaders of the French socialist party, Jean-Pierre Chevènement, Arlette Laguiller, Olivier Besancenot, Jean-Luc Mélenchon, etc.) as well as famous journalists (Edwy Plenel, Guillaume Meurice, etc.)

Artists involved
Many artists such as Roger Hodgson, Léo Ferré, Stevie Wonder, Pink Floyd, The Who, Deep Purple, Jacques Brel, Johnny Hallyday, Renaud, Chuck Berry, Jacques Dutronc, Leonard Cohen, and Joan Baez have performed at this event.

1960
 Paul Robeson
 Jacques Brel

1961
 Léo Ferré
 Robert Lamoureux
 Catherine Sauvage

1962
 Jean Ferrat
 Léo Ferré
 Georges Brassens

1964
 Eddy Mitchell
 Charles Trenet
 Annie Cordy
 Nana Mouskouri

1966
 Nino Ferrer
 Juliette Gréco
 Guy Béart
 Hugues Auffray

1968
 Mireille Mathieu

1969
 Jacques Dutronc

1970
 Pink Floyd

1971
 Claude Nougaro
 Joan Baez

1972
 The Who
 Mireille Mathieu
 Country Joe and the Fish
 Golden Earring
 Ewa Demarczyk

1973
 Chuck Berry
 Jerry Lee Lewis
 Alan Stivell
 Catherine Ribeiro

1974
 Leonard Cohen
The Kinks
Mikis Theodorakis

1975
 Jacques Higelin

1976

 Area
 Guy Bedos
 Maurice Béjart
 Julien Clerc
 Louise Forestier
 Bernard Lavilliers
 Maxime Le Forestier
 Bernard Lubat
 Claude Nougaro
 Quilapayún
 Archie Shepp
 Mikis Theodorakis
 Brenda Wootton

1977
 Alan Stivell
 Brand X
 Joan Pau Verdier

1978
 Genesis

1979
 Charles Trenet
 Catherine Ribeiro
 Gilles Vigneault

1981
 Ray Charles

1982
 Magma

1983
 Julien Clerc
 Robert Charlebois

1984
 The Communards
 Nina Hagen
 Renaud

1985
 Johnny Hallyday

1986
 Jacques Higelin
 Eddy Mitchell
 Sapho (singer)

1987
 Demis Roussos

1988
 Kassav

1990
 Johnny Clegg
 Manu Dibango
 Dee Dee Bridgewater
 Paul Personne
 Colin James

1991
 Johnny Logan

1992 
 MC Solaar
 The Kinks
 Calvin Russell
 Bernard Lavilliers
 Léo Ferré

1993
 Princess Erika
 Michel Fugain

1994
 Midnight Oil
 No One Is Innocent
 Johnny Clegg and Savuka

1995
 Jacques Higelin

1996
 Maxime Le Forestier
 Jimmy Cliff

1997
 Robert Charlebois
 Cesária Évora

1998
 Sinsemilla
 Cheb Mami
 Raggasonic

2000
 Eddy Mitchell

2001
 Manu Chao
 Ska-P

2004
 Youssou N'Dour
 The Rasmus
 Dub Incorporation

2005
 Asian Dub Foundation
 Bernard Lavilliers
 The Offspring

2007
 The Stooges
 Razorlight
 Ayọ

2008
 Roger Hodgson
 Babyshambles
 NERD

2009
 Deep Purple
 The Kooks

2010
 Raggasonic
 The Prodigy
 Madness
 Simple Minds

2011
 Joan Baez
 Avril Lavigne

2014
 Richard Stallman

2015
 Texas
 Manu Chao
 Shaka Ponk

2016
 The Chemical Brothers
 Michel Polnareff
 Lauryn Hill
 Alain Souchon
 Laurent Voulzy
 Joey Starr
 Caribbean Dandee
 Ludwig Von 88

2017
 Iggy Pop
 Renaud
 Feder
 Trust
 Dub Inc

2018
 Franz Ferdinand
 Julien Clerc
 Bernard Lavilliers
 Bigflo & Oli

References

External links

 Official site in French
 lls se sont produits à la Fête de l’Humanité... (incomplete list of the participants)

Music festivals in France
Communist press festivals
French Communist Party